USS Bordelon (DD/DDR-881) was one of 98 World War II s of the United States Navy, and was named for Marine Staff Sergeant William J. Bordelon (1920–1943), who was posthumously awarded the Medal of Honor for his heroism in the Battle of Tarawa.

Bordelon was laid down by the Consolidated Steel Corporation at Orange, Texas on 9 September 1944, launched on 3 March 1945 by Mrs. W. J. Bordelon, the mother of Staff Sergeant Bordelon, and commissioned on 5 June 1945.

Service history
Bordelon operated as a part of the occupation force in Japan until March 1946, then alternated operations along the east coast and in the Caribbean with the 2nd Fleet with deployments to the Mediterranean with the 6th Fleet.
In October of 1962 the Bordelon deployed from its home port of Charleston, SC to the Caribbean to participate in the blockade of Russian ships during the Cuban Crisis.
Bordelon assisted in fighting the fire on the cruiser  after Belknaps collision with the aircraft carrier  on the night of 22 November 1975.

On 14 September 1976, while refueling alongside USS John F. Kennedy, the ships came together and collided. Bordelons port bow and some of the superstructure were damaged and the main mast snapped and fell on the signal shack, injuring some of the handling team.

The ammunition ship  was also involved in the rescue of Bordelon by escorting her to an ammunition depot where Mount Bakers explosive ordnance disposal (EOD) team off-loaded her entire cargo of ammunition while providing electric and water services.

Due to the damage to the superstructure and electronics and the age and condition of the hull, Bordelon was decommissioned and struck from the Naval Vessel Register on 1 February 1977, transferred to Iran in July 1977, and cannibalized for spare parts.

References

External links

navsource.org: USS Bordelon
hazegray.org: USS Bordelon
 

Gearing-class destroyers of the United States Navy
Ships built in Orange, Texas
1945 ships
World War II destroyers of the United States
Cold War destroyers of the United States
Vietnam War destroyers of the United States
Ships transferred from the United States Navy to the Imperial Iranian Navy